Fritz Bölle was a Swiss footballer who played for FC Basel in the mid-1920s. He played as a forward.

In the two seasons 1925–26 and 1926–27 Bölle played eight games for Baselfive in the Swiss Serie A, one in the Swiss Cup and two friendliesand scoring once. He made his debut in the first game of the 1925–26 Serie A season on 6 September 1925 against Solothurn. He scored his only goal in the next game on 13 September in the home game at the Landhof as Basel beat Concordia Basel 7–0.

References

Sources
 Rotblau: Jahrbuch Saison 2017/2018. Publisher: FC Basel Marketing AG. 
 Die ersten 125 Jahre. Publisher: Josef Zindel im Friedrich Reinhardt Verlag, Basel. 
 Verein "Basler Fussballarchiv" Homepage

FC Basel players
Swiss men's footballers
Association football forwards